The Haparanda Line is a  long railway line between Boden and Haparanda in Sweden. The line is the only Swedish railway to the Finnish border.

The single track line was used exclusively by freight trains between 1992 and 2021, during which time it was necessary to use buses from Luleå to the Haparanda bus station, with onward connections to Kemi in Finland. Passenger service began again on the 1st of April, 2021, operated by Vy Norrtåg.

History

The railway from Boden to Haparanda was built in several sections over the course of 17 years. The first segment to be completed was Buddbyn to Niemisel in 1900, followed by the segment Niemisel to Morjärv in 1902. The railway did not reach Lappträsk until in 1910, and the Swedish–Finland border at Karungi on the west bank of Torne River was not reached until 1913.

Karungi was to become a junction, and the railway reaching northward to Övertorneå was built in 1914, followed by the southern Karungi to Haparanda line in 1915. The only open railway connection between Germany and Russia during World War I went here. Lenin traveled here in 1917 to organise the Russian Revolution. The bridge over the Torne River between Haparanda and Tornio was placed in service in 1919. Before that passengers had to walk or use horse carriages the short distance between the cities.

The station building was finished in 1918, and was dimensioned based on the traffic during the war. All international travellers had to change trains here because of the break-of-gauge, and had to go through passport check.  During World War II, the traffic was dense again since the Baltic Sea was not safe.  It is one of Sweden's largest station buildings, but only used to some extent for rail purposes (since 2021).

The branch line from Morjärv towards Kalix was built in 1961. Traffic between Karungi and Övertorneå was discontinued in 1984, and the line was torn up soon thereafter. In 1986 a more direct route was built between Övermorjärv and Östra Flakaträsk, bypassing the Räktjärv station. The old line along with one bridge was demolished soon after the new shortcut was built; however, the old line is still visible on many Swedish maps.

Passenger traffic ceased in 1992. The connection to the Finnish trains was already broken in 1988 when the Haparanda–Tornio–Kemi trains were discontinued. There was a test with tourist traffic between Boden–Haparanda in the summer of 2000.

During the period 2007 to 2012, the line from Buddbyn (near Boden Central Station) to Morjärv and Kalix was upgraded, and an alternate route from Kalix to Haparanda was built. The line was electrified in the same time. The old line from Morjärv over Karungi to Haparanda was abandoned in 2012.
In 2013, the European Train Control System (level 2) signalling system was introduced on the line.

In 2020, Norrtåg applied to start passenger services from Luleå and Boden to Haparanda. Passenger services restarted on the 1st of April 2021, including one weekday round trip to/from Umeå. A new railway station was built in Kalix.

See also
North Bothnia Line

Notes

References

External links

Railway lines in Sweden
Railway lines opened in 1900
Rail transport in Norrbotten County
1900 establishments in Sweden